is a Japanese pay television entertainment and kids channel owned and operated by The Walt Disney Company Japan. Part of Disney Branded Television a subsidiary of Disney International Operations. It began in 2003 as a basic TV channel, and it was exclusive to SKY PerfecTV.

History 
On 24 April 2003, The Walt Disney Company announced that Disney Channel would launch in Japan, following the 20th anniversary of both Disney Channel and Tokyo Disneyland; it took place on 18 November 2003 on Sky PerfecTV.

Branding 
On November 1, 2014, Disney Channel unveiled a new logo and an on-air imaging design. On March 1, 2015, Watch Disney Channel also unveiled a new logo and an on-air imaging design.

Movies 
Disney Channel airs movies at 8pm on Fridays, Saturdays and Sundays and at 10pm on Mondays to Thursdays and at 2pm on weekends.

References

External links 
 Official website (In Japanese)

Japan
Television stations in Japan
Japanese-language television stations
Television channels and stations established in 2003
Children's television channels in Japan
2003 establishments in Japan